The Ningbo International Tennis Open is a tennis tournament held in Ningbo, China. The event was part of the WTA 125K series and is now part of the ATP Challenger Tour. It is played on outdoor hardcourts. The men's event ended in 2012 but restarted in 2015. The event was previously called the Ningbo Challenger.

Past finals

Women's singles

Women's doubles

Men's singles

Men's doubles

External links
 http://www.wtatennis.com/tournaments/tournamentId/3265/title/yinzhou-bank-international-womens-tennis-open
 Women's ITF Search
 Men's ITF Search

 
ATP Challenger Tour
ITF Women's World Tennis Tour
WTA 125 tournaments
Tennis tournaments in China
Hard court tennis tournaments
Sport in Ningbo
Recurring sporting events established in 2010